Letters from My Windmill is a collection of short stories by Alphonse Daudet first published in its entirety in 1869.  Some of the stories had been published earlier in newspapers or journals such as Le Figaro and L'Evénement as early as 1865.

The stories are all told by the author in the first person, typically addressing a Parisian reader.  The author, having relocated his home from Paris, recounts short bucolic tales about his new life in Provence as well as his trips to Corsica and French Algeria.  The stories vary from day-to-day events in southern France to Provençal folktales, and often feature professions and faunal references characteristic of Provence.  The tales are characterised by pity, tenderness and sadness, alongside gaiety and mockery.

Letters From My Windmill is sometimes considered to be Daudet's most important work.  It is cherished by many French, particularly in the South, for the picture it paints of the local culture.

A French-language film with the same title was made in 1954 by Marcel Pagnol composed of four stories: "The Three Low Masses", "The Elixir of Father Gaucher", "The Priest of Cucugnan"  and "The Secret Of Master Cornille".

Trivia

The Belgian comic author Mitteï made a comic adaptation of the book in three volumes between 1979-1985, which were released in Dutch, French and the French dialect of Liège.

References

Further reading
 Hare, Geoffrey E. (1982). "The Unity of Lettres de Mon Moulin," Nineteenth-Century French Studies, Vol. 10, No. 3/4, pp. 317–325.

External links
Letters from My Mill at Internet Archive (scanned books original editions illustrated color)
Les Lettres de Mon Moulin (1954), movie review, New York Times, December 19, 1955.
  Letters From My Windmill, audio version : beginning and final part 
 Translated by Harmelin and Adams
Lettres de mon moulin, comic adaptation by Mitteï

1869 short story collections
French short story collections
Works by Alphonse Daudet